Garbutt is a surname associated with English-speaking culture.

Etymology

In origin, Garbutt is a personal name. It (and the variants Garbut, Garbett, Garbet, Garbert, Garbould, Gorbold, Gorbutt, Gorbett, Gorbert, Carbett, Carbert, Carbutt, Carbould, and Carbott) come from several different names which were brought to England by settlers associated with the Norman conquest: Gerbold, Gerbert, and Gerbod. All these names themselves came into use among the Normans by borrowing from Continental Germanic, and became confused with one another already in the Middle Ages.

Distribution

In the spelling Garbutt, the name was borne by 2163 people in the 1881 Census of the United Kingdom, mostly in Yorkshire and County Durham, particularly in the North Riding. As of around 2016, 2877 people bore the name in Great Britain and 72 in Ireland.

References

See also
 Garbutt (disambiguation)

Surnames of German origin